Compsocephalus is a genus of flower chafers belonging to the family Scarabaeidae, subfamily Cetoniinae. These beetles are most commonly found in East Africa, more specifically Kenya.

Appearance
Compsocephalus are medium to large beetles, with a consistent metallic shine to their colouration. The male has a short, pointed horn on its forehead.

Species
Compsocephalus bayeri (Moser, 1917)
Compsocephalus bennigseni (Kuhnt, 1909)
Compsocephalus dmitriewi Olsufiew, 1902 
Compsocephalus dohertyi (Jordan, 1901)
Compsocephalus horsfieldianus White, 1845
Compsocephalus kachowskii Olsufiew, 1902
Compsocephalus kiellandi (Allard, 1985)
Compsocephalus preussi (Kolbe, 1892)
Compsocephalus rotteveeli Drumont, 1996
Compsocephalus thomasi (Kolbe, 1904)

References

Scarabaeidae genera
Cetoniinae